Abdul Manaf bin Mamat (born 8 April 1987) is a Malaysian professional footballer who plays for Harini F.C. as a forward. He made nine appearances for the Malaysia national team scoring twice.

Career
Manaf has played for the Malaysia national team and Malaysia U23. He played one Olympic qualification match against Japan in 2007.

He was selected by Malaysia coach K.Rajagobal for the 2009 SEA Games football tournament. He scored one goal against Cambodia in the group stage, as Malaysia won the competition.

He made his full international debut against Saudi Arabia in August 2009. He only scored twice for the Malaysian senior team, both of which were against Lesotho.

Born in Kuala Terengganu, Manaf began playing football as a striker with local side Terengganu. In 2011, Manaf won his first domestic title, the Malaysia FA Cup with Terengganu by defeating Kelantan. Manaf scored six goal in 2011 Malaysia Cup and was a part of the team that lose 2–1 to Negeri Sembilan FA in the final. On 5 December 2015, he was revealed as one of Kelantan new player for 2016 Malaysia Super League. After he fully healed from his leg injury, he finally get to debut for the team as a substitute for Wan Zack Haikal in the match against his former club, Terengganu which ended in 6–1 win for the away team.

Manaf started the 2018 season with Marcerra Kuantan. The club hit financial problems, was expelled from the league, and he terminated his contract in April 2018; he joined MOF F.C. for the remainder of the season. After being a star player and a Malaysia international earlier in his career, Manaf struggled for months without pay while playing for Kuantan and Batu Dua. He had to sell durian fruit to supplement his footballing income.

Career statistics

Club

International

Scores and results list Malaysia's goal tally first, score column indicates score after each Manaf goal.

Honours
Terengganu
 Malaysia FA Cup: 2011

Malaysia
 2009 Southeast Asian Games: Gold Medalist
 2014 AFF Suzuki Cup: Runner Up

References

External links
 

1987 births
Living people
Malaysian footballers
Malaysia international footballers
Terengganu FC players
Kelantan FA players
People from Terengganu
Malaysia Super League players
Association football forwards
Malaysian people of Malay descent
Southeast Asian Games gold medalists for Malaysia
Southeast Asian Games medalists in football
Competitors at the 2009 Southeast Asian Games